Sam Walter Foss (June 19, 1858 – February 26, 1911) was an American librarian and poet whose works included The House by the Side of the Road and The Coming American.

Life and career

Foss was born in rural Candia, New Hampshire, the son of Polly (Hardy) and Dyer Foss. His mother died when he was four years old, and he worked on his father's farm and went to school in the winter.  Foss attended the Tilton Seminary, now Tilton School, before attending and graduating from Brown University in 1882. He would eventually be considered illustrious enough to warrant having his name inscribed on the mace. Beginning in 1898, he served as librarian at the Somerville Public Library in Massachusetts.  He married a minister's daughter, with whom he had a daughter and son.  Foss used to write a poem a day for the newspapers, and his five volumes of collected poetry are of the frank and homely “common man” variety.

Foss is buried in the North Burial Ground in Providence, Rhode Island. He is featured on a New Hampshire historical marker (number 114) along New Hampshire Route 43 in Candia.

Influence

Foss's most famous poem is The Coming American, which was published in his 1895 book Whiffs from Wild Meadows. The poem rambles aimlessly through six pages about America's past, present, and future before turning to its most famous section: a "call" supposedly sent by "our Great Fate" to the future of America.  The call begins as follows: "Bring me men to match my mountains / Bring me men to match my plains / Men with empires in their purpose / And new eras in their brains."   For many years, these four lines were inscribed on a granite wall at the United States Air Force Academy to inspire cadets and officers, but they were removed in 2003 in reaction to the Air Force Academy sexual assault scandal.

The poem is currently engraved and displayed at Epcot in Orlando, Florida, and also inscribed onto the Rocky Mountain Cup trophy, which is contested annually between Major League Soccer teams Real Salt Lake and Colorado Rapids.  The first line of the call is displayed prominently on the south facade of the Jesse M. Unruh State Office Building in Sacramento, California.

Singer Lamya's song "Empires (Bring Me Men)" takes its opening lyrics from The Coming American, and the poem serves as inspiration for the rest of the song.

Longtime baseball announcer Ernie Harwell alluded to Foss's The House by the Side of the Road whenever he described a batter taking a called third strike: "He stood there like the house by the side of the road and watched it go by."

A recitation of Foss's Two Gods provides the lyrics to the song "A Greater God" by MC 900 Ft. Jesus.

Works
 Back Country Poems (1892)
 Whiffs from Wild Meadows (1895)
 Dreams in Homespun (1897)
 Songs of War and Peace (1899)
 The Song of the Library Staff "Read at the annual meeting of the American Library Association, Narragansett Pier, July 6, 1906" (Published separately (details needed), but also included in 'Songs of the Average Man'(1906)
 Songs of the Average Man (1907)

References

External links

 
 
  Poems by Sam Walter Foss
  House by the Side of the Road
 
  Poems by Sam Walter Foss at English Poetry

1858 births
1911 deaths
American male poets
People from Candia, New Hampshire
Poets from Massachusetts
Burials at North Burying Ground (Providence)
Tilton School alumni
American librarians